Carolina Giraldo Navarro (born 14 February 1991), known professionally as Karol G (stylized in all caps), is a Colombian singer and songwriter. She is predominantly described as a reggaeton and Latin trap artist, but has experimented with a variety of other genres including reggae and sertanejo. In 2018, she won the Latin Grammy Award for Best New Artist, and has been nominated for several Billboard Latin Music Awards and Lo Nuestro Awards.

Born and raised in Medellín, Giraldo launched her career as a teenager, appearing on the Colombian spinoff of The X Factor. She moved to New York City in 2014 to learn more about the music industry and signed to Universal Music Latino. Her collaboration with Puerto Rican rapper Bad Bunny "Ahora Me Llama" became her breakthrough hit, and was the lead single for her debut album Unstoppable, released in 2017. In late 2018, her song "Secreto" became a hit in Latin America as she and Anuel AA publicly confirmed their relationship in the music video.

In July 2019, she released "China" in collaboration with Anuel AA, Daddy Yankee, Ozuna and J Balvin, which became her first music video with over one billion views on YouTube. In May 2019, she released the album Ocean, which served as a stylistic departure from Unstoppable, incorporating a more relaxed atmosphere in her work. Her song "Tusa" with Nicki Minaj also charted internationally and was certified 28× Latin Platinum by the RIAA, staying on the Billboard Hot Latin Songs chart for 25 weeks. In 2020, Karol G received four nominations at the Latin Grammys. Karol G achieved her highest-charting single on the Billboard Hot 100 with the top 10 song "TQG", a collaboration with Shakira.

With her fourth album, Mañana Será Bonito (2023), Karol G became the first woman to ever debut at number one on the Billboard 200 chart with a Spanish-language album.

Early life 
Carolina Giraldo Navarro was born on 14 February 1991 in Medellín, the youngest child of three children. At age fourteen, she appeared on the Colombian version of The X Factor. A few years after her performance on the show, she obtained her first record contract with Flamingo Records (Colombia) & Diamond Music (Puerto Rico) and chose "Karol G" as her artistic name. She performed with J Balvin at a quinceañera party soon after.

Musical career

2007–2016: Beginnings 
In the following years, she recorded and released songs sporadically, including "En La Playa" in 2007, "Por Ti" in 2008, "Dime Que Si" in 2009 and "Mil Maneras" in 2010. She studied music at the University of Antioquia and sang backup for other artists during her studies, including Reykon, recording the songs "Tu Juguete" in 2011 and "301" in 2012. Shortly after, she traveled to Miami to meet with Universal Records, who declined to sign her, fearing that a woman would not be successful in the reggaeton genre.

In response to Universal Music's decision, she and her father decided to promote her career independently by touring extensively across Colombia at colleges, clubs, and festivals. Karol G recalled, "I always said that if we'd made money per miles, we'd be millionaires. It was a long process... and because of it, I can truly enjoy what's happening now." The increased publicity through these tours led to her 2013 collaboration with Nicky Jam on the song "Amor de Dos". However, finding that her career was not progressing enough, Karol G moved to New York in 2014. Prompted by a subway advertisement, she took music business administration classes, which helped her learn about the industry and motivated her to further her career. Her 2014 dancehall song "Ricos Besos" became a hit in Colombia. In 2016, she signed with Universal Music Latino. During the year, she released the songs "Casi Nada", "Hello" with then-rising star Ozuna, and "Muñeco de Lego".

2017–2018: Breakthrough success and Unstoppable 
In January 2017, Karol G joined the reality talent show Pequeños Gigantes USA as a judge, offering advice to children 6–11 years of age who perform on the show. In February she released the song "A Ella", a song inspired by real-life events. In May, her collaboration with Puerto Rican trap artist Bad Bunny, "Ahora Me Llama", became regarded as her breakthrough hit. The video garnered more than 756 million views on YouTube and reached number 10 on the Billboard Hot Latin Songs chart. The song was described by Marty Preciado of NPR as a "bass-heavy, unapologetic trap anthem to the power of femininity, soiled in hi-hats and heavy sub-bass [that] challenges hegemonic masculinity, singing about respect, love and sex-positive decisions." According to Ecleen Luzmila Caraballo of Rolling Stone, "it was then that Giraldo joined the increasingly-global pop urbano wave and established herself as one of its most standout acts". "Ahora Me Llama" was listed on "Alt.Latino's Favorites: The Songs Of 2017" as one of the best Latin songs of 2017.

"Ahora Me Llama" served as the lead single (and a remix she did the with the song featuring Bad Bunny) for her debut studio album, Unstoppable, although it contained the three aforementioned tracks, which was released in October 2017 and debuted at number two on the Billboard Top Latin Albums chart. Thom Jurek of AllMusic called Unstoppable "the first solid entry by a woman in the Latin trap movement". In March 2018, the singer released the jungle-inspired music video for her single "Pineapple". In that same month, she was announced as a finalist for the Billboard Latin Music Awards top female artist of the year. In May 2018, she released "Mi Cama", which became a commercial success. This was followed by "Culpables", featuring Puerto Rican rapper Anuel AA. "Culpables" peaked at number eight on the Billboard Hot Latin songs, while the remix of "Mi Cama" featuring J Balvin and Nicky Jam peaked at number six on the same chart.

2019: Ocean 

In January 2019, the singer released the single "Secreto" with Puerto Rican rapper Anuel AA confirming the romantic relationship between the two artists in the song's accompanying music video. The single reached number 68 on the Billboard Hot 100 and number five on the US Hot Latin Songs charts. The song was inspired by the period of time in which Anuel AA and Karol G were dating but had not yet publicly discussed their relationship. The video's "power couple" aesthetic garnered comparisons to Beyoncé and Jay-Z as well as Jennifer Lopez and Marc Anthony. She released the album Ocean on 3 May 2019. The album was inspired by a moment of relaxation she experienced at the beach on the Spanish island of Tenerife, and she traveled to the beaches of the Turks and Caicos Islands and Saint Martin to draw further inspiration for the album. Elias Leight of Rolling Stone reviewed the album by stating, "The power of Ocean is somewhat diminished by the fact that a third of these songs are already out" but opined that "the remaining tracks are impressively varied".

In July 2019, Karol G collaborated with Anuel AA, Daddy Yankee, Ozuna, and J Balvin on the song "China". The song heavily samples Shaggy's 2000 single, "It Wasn't Me". "China" debuted at number two on Billboards Hot Latin Songs chart on the issue dated 3 August 2019, and topped both the Latin Digital Songs and Latin Streaming Songs charts with 1,000 downloads sold and 14.1 million streams. "China" was included on the Rolling Stone list of the 10 Best Latin Music Videos of July.  Karol G premiered the song on American television on The Tonight Show Starring Jimmy Fallon on 10 January 2020. The song reached number one on the Billboard Hot Latin Songs chart on 23 November 2019 and stayed on the chart for 25 weeks.

2019–2021: KG0516 
Karol G released "Tusa", the first single from her album KG0516, on 7 November 2019. Tusa, a reggaeton song featuring Nicki Minaj, became a commercial success, eventually being nominated for Record of the Year and Song of the Year at the 21st Annual Latin Grammy Awards.

In April 2020, Karol G released the single and video for "Follow" with Anuel AA, recording its entirety while in quarantine in Miami due to the COVID-19 pandemic. She also collaborated with the Jonas Brothers on the "flirtatious" song "X" which first appeared in the end credits of the group's documentary film Happiness Continues. Karol G and the Jonas Brothers filmed the song's accompanying music video on their iPhones, using the combined footage as a "clever way to get around the obvious challenge of trying to film a music video during the COVID-19 crisis".

In October, "Bichota" was released as the album's official lead single, becoming viral online.

On 17 March 2021, Karol G announced the release of her upcoming album as well as its release date and cover art through a half-minute video. The tracklist was announced on 22 March, and on 26 March, KG0516 was released.

In October 2021, Karol G teamed up with Smirnoff for their "Sabor for the People" campaign. As part of the deal, her Bichota Tour is presented by Smirnoff. On 14 February 2022, Karol G and Crocs announced a partnership by unveiling two different shoe silhouettes.

2021–present: Mañana Será Bonito 
Karol G released "Sejodioto", on 21 September 2021. "Sejodioto", a reggaeton song, became a commercial success, eventually being nominated for Record of the Year and Song of the Year.

In April 2022, "Provenza" was released as the album's lead single, becoming viral online.

In August 2022 Karol G released "Gatúbela" alongside Maldy from Plan B. The song, whose title means "Catwoman", features a beat characteristic of old-school, 2000s reggaeton, with a dembow rhythm. Its music video takes inspiration from horror movies, and is the first to show off Karol G's dyed red hair.

Artistry

Musical style 

Karol G's music has been described as predominantly reggaeton and Latin trap. However, she has experimented with a variety of other genres in her work. Her album Ocean features a wide range of stylistic experimentation. She collaborated with Brazilian duo Simone & Simaria on the Spanish/Portuguese song "La Vida Continuó", which contains influences from the genre of sertanejo. Karol G cites the global appeal of singers Beyoncé, Selena, and Shakira as major influences in her work and the level of global recognition she hopes to achieve. Karol G has a tattoo of her own face alongside those of Rihanna and Selena on her right forearm. Additional influences include Rosalía, Backstreet Boys, Christina Aguilera, Ivy Queen, Anahí, Thalía, Spice Girls, Jerry Rivera, Bee Gees, and Red Hot Chili Peppers.

Public image 
Ecleen Luzmila Caraballo of Rolling Stone describes Karol G's style of dress as "feminine and sexy, yet sporty and tomboyish — but never [cutesy]". Gary Suarez of Vice notes that in her music videos, "she exudes a sex positivity that reflects a powerful diva image front and center, rather than the eye candy tropes often found in urbano visuals." Karol G has a large LGBT following, and the singer expressed admiration for her gay fans by explaining, "I love people who can go out into the world and be fearless...That's something I admire very much from that community. They have a beautiful energy." She declined to record "Sin Pijama" with Becky G, which would become a collaboration with Natti Natasha and be a hit, because of a lyric about smoking marijuana in the song. Karol G, who does not smoke marijuana, felt that the song did not represent her true lifestyle. For her album Ocean, Karol G moved away from the polished image of the Unstoppable album cover, with the artist explaining, "I did the picture with no makeup, super natural. Because that's the way I want people to listen to my music now."

In 2020, Karol G's tweet about her dog's "perfect" color and citing it as an example of white and black looking beautiful together sparked controversy. She later admitted to have acted in "an ignorant way" at a time when Black Lives Matter had gripped America in 2020. Karol G also admitted to have "lost a lot of opportunities" in her interview with The Guardian.

Personal life 
Karol G met Puerto Rican rapper Anuel AA in August 2018 on the set of the music video for their song "Culpables", a month after his release from prison. In January 2019, the couple confirmed their relationship. On 25 April 2019, Karol G arrived at the Billboard Latin Music Awards wearing a diamond wedding ring, confirming the couple's engagement. On 20 April 2021, Anuel AA confirmed the couple had ended their relationship.

Discography 

 Unstoppable (2017)
 Ocean (2019)
 KG0516 (2021)
 Mañana Será Bonito (2023)

Filmography

Tours 
Headlining
 Unstoppable Tour (2017–18)
 Ocean World Tour (2019–20)
 Bichota Tour (2021–23) (also named Strip Love Tour) 

Promotional
 Girl Power Tour (2017)

Co-headlining
 Culpables Tour   (2019)

Awards and nominations 

Karol G has received several awards and nominations including two Latin Grammy Awards, two Billboard Music Awards, two MTV Europe Music Awards, one American Music Award and ten Lo Nuestro Awards, among others.

References

External links 

 
 Karol G on Spotify

1991 births
Living people
Latin trap musicians
People from Medellín
21st-century Colombian women singers
Latin Grammy Award winners
Latin Grammy Award for Best New Artist
Colombian reggaeton musicians
Women in Latin music
Universal Music Latino artists
Latin music songwriters